Billy Martin (born in 1981) is an American musician best known as the rhythm guitarist and keyboardist of the pop punk band Good Charlotte.

Early life and career
Martin started his first band, Overflow, with Steve Sievers, who later helped Martin run his clothing line, Level 27. In December 2009, Martin liquidated his clothing company Level 27, saying that it was a great outlet for his artistic whims, it had served its purpose and would not be kept going as a clothing brand. He also appeared with his bandmates in the 2001 film Not Another Teen Movie and the television special iCarly iGo to Japan.

Personal life
On March 1, 2008, Martin married hairstylist Linzi Williamson, whom he had been dating for eight years. On January 26, 2009, she gave birth to their first child.

Discography

Good Charlotte (2000)
The Young and the Hopeless (2002)
The Chronicles of Life and Death (2004)
Good Morning Revival (2007)
Cardiology (2010)
Youth Authority (2016)
Generation Rx (2018)

References

American rock guitarists
American male guitarists
Good Charlotte
Guitarists from Maryland
People from Annapolis, Maryland
Rhythm guitarists
Twitch (service) streamers
Living people
People from Severna Park, Maryland
1981 births